Resume the Cosmos is the fourth studio album by Rake., released in 1998 by Camera Obscura.

Track listing

Personnel 
Adapted from the Resume the Cosmos liner notes.
Rake.
Jim Ayre – electric guitar, clarinet, vocals
Bill Kellum – bass guitar
Carl Moller – drums, saxophone, mixing

Release history

References

External links 
 Resume the Cosmos at Discogs (list of releases)

1998 albums
Rake (band) albums